Urothemis aliena, commonly called the red baron, is a species of dragonfly found in northern and eastern Australia and New Guinea. It is a member of the family Libellulidae.
It inhabits riverine lagoons and ponds.
 
Urothemis aliena is a medium-sized dragonfly (wingspan 85mm, length 45mm) with a bright red body and two dark spots on segments eight and nine of its abdomen. The hindwing has a dark triangular-shaped reddish-brown mark at the base. Its Australian distribution is from Broome, Western Australia along the north of the continent to the southern Queensland border.

Gallery

See also
 Urothemis
 List of Odonata species of Australia

References

Libellulidae
Odonata of Australia
Insects of New Guinea
Taxa named by Edmond de Sélys Longchamps
Insects described in 1878